SV Vesta Stadion is a football stadium located in Santa Maria Willemstad, Curaçao with a capacity of 3,000 spectators.

The stadium is currently used mostly for football matches.

References 

Football venues in Curaçao